The Walloon Government or Government of Wallonia is the executive branch of Wallonia, and it is part of one of the six main governments of Belgium. It sits in Namur, where the Parliament of Wallonia is seated as well.

Compositions

Current composition (Di Rupo III)
On 13 September 2019 it was announced that Elio Di Rupo would become the minister-President of Wallonia again for the third time, in a government led by the  PS (23 seats), together with  MR (20 seats) and  Ecolo (12 seats).

Composition 2017–2019 (Borsus)
On 19 June 2017, the  CDH announced it was no longer willing to govern together with the PS following several scandals in Belgian politics in which high placed members of the PS were involved typically receiving high payments for extra functions, including in Publifin and SAMU Social. On July 25, the CDH (13 seats) formed a new coalition together with the  MR (25 seats), only narrowly getting a majority (38 out of 75 seats), to create the first government since 1988 in which the PS was not involved. The number of ministers was reduced from eight to seven.

Composition 2014–2017 (Magnette)
Following the 25 May 2014 election,  PS (30 seats) and  CDH (13 seats) parties formed a coalition.

Composition 2009–2014
Following the 7 June 2009 election,  PS (29 seats),  Ecolo (14 seats) and  CDH (13 seats) parties formed a coalition.

Composition 2004–2009
After the elections of 13 June 2004, the PS (34 seats) en CDH (14 seats) formed a coalition.

References

External links
 
 

1981 establishments in Belgium
Politics of Wallonia
Government of Belgium